Ruslan Ruslanovich Suanov (born 18 June 1975) is a Russian retired professional footballer. He made his debut in the Russian Premier League in 1992 for FC Spartak Vladikavkaz.

His son, also called Ruslan Suanov, is now a footballer as well.

His father, also called Ruslan Suanov, was footballer.

Honours
 Russian Premier League runner-up: 1992.
 Russian Second Division Zone West top scorer: 2002 (35 goals), 2006 (21 goals).

References

1975 births
Sportspeople from Vladikavkaz
Living people
Russian footballers
Russian expatriate footballers
Expatriate footballers in Ukraine
FC Spartak Vladikavkaz players
FC Zhemchuzhina Sochi players
FC Tekstilshchik Kamyshin players
FC Kuban Krasnodar players
FC Baltika Kaliningrad players
FC Metalurh Zaporizhzhia players
FC Lokomotiv Nizhny Novgorod players
Russian Premier League players
FC Metallurg Lipetsk players
FC Volgar Astrakhan players
Ukrainian Premier League players
Russian football managers
FC Arsenal Tula players
Association football forwards
FC Dynamo Saint Petersburg players
FC Lokomotiv Saint Petersburg players
FC Spartak Kostroma players
FC Sportakademklub Moscow players